Patrick Matautaava (born 27 September 1991) is a Vanuatuan cricketer. He played in the 2013 ICC World Cricket League Division Six tournament.

In September 2017, during the 2017 ICC World Cricket League Division Five tournament, Matautaava scored 139 not out off 76 balls against Germany. He scored the most runs for Vanuatu in the tournament, with a total of 290 runs in five matches.

In March 2018, he was named in Vanuatu's squad for the 2018 ICC World Cricket League Division Four tournament in Malaysia. He was named as the player to watch in the squad ahead of the tournament. He was the leading wicket-taker for Vanuatu in the tournament, with nine dismissals in five matches.

In August 2018, he was named in Vanuatu's squad for Group A of the 2018–19 ICC World Twenty20 East Asia-Pacific Qualifier tournament. In March 2019, he was named in the Vanuatuan squad for the Regional Finals of the 2018–19 ICC World Twenty20 East Asia-Pacific Qualifier tournament.

He made his Twenty20 International (T20I) debut for Vanuatu on 9 July 2019, against Papua New Guinea, in the men's tournament at the 2019 Pacific Games. In September 2019, he was named in Vanuatu's squad for the 2019 Malaysia Cricket World Cup Challenge League A tournament. He made his List A debut for Vanuatu, against Canada, in the Cricket World Cup Challenge League A tournament on 17 September 2019.

Later in September 2019, he was named in Vanuatu's squad for their series against Malaysia. In the second match of the series, Matautaava scored 103 runs from 52 balls, becoming the first batsman for Vanuatu to score a century in a T20I match.

In April 2022, he signed a six-month deal with Herning Cricket Club in Denmark as a player-coach. He scored 99 runs in 55 balls while making his debut for the club, against Soraner at Skanderborg.

References

External links
 

1991 births
Living people
Vanuatuan cricketers
Vanuatu Twenty20 International cricketers
Place of birth missing (living people)